Inés Ayala Sender (born 28 March 1957 in Zaragoza) is a Spanish politician who served as a Member of the European Parliament (MEP) from 2004 until 2019 for the Spanish Socialist Workers' Party, which is affiliated to the Party of European Socialists. She was first elected to the European Parliament in 2004, and was re-elected in 2009 and 2014.

Early career
Ayala Sender served as national expert in the Directorate-General for the Environment of the European Commission from 1995 to 1997. Between 1997 and 2004, she worked as policy adviser to the PES Group for various committees and delegations of the European Parliament, including the Committee on Transport and Tourism.

Member of the European Parliament, 2004–2019
Ayala Sender first became a Member of the European Parliament in the 2004 European elections. Throughout her time in parliament, she served on the Committee on Budgetary Control and on the Committee on Transport and Tourism. On the Committee on Budgetary Control, she was the coordinator of the Progressive Alliance of Socialists and Democrats. In 2007, she joined the parliament's delegation for relations with the countries of Central America. Between 2005 and 2009, she was a member of the Committee on Petitions.
	
On the Committee on Budgetary Control, Ayala Sender served as her parliamentary group's coordinator from 2014 until 2019. She was also a member of the Democracy Support and Election Coordination Group (DEG), which oversees the Parliament's election observation missions.

In addition to her committee assignments, Ayala Sender was a member of the European Parliament Intergroup on Integrity (Transparency, Anti-Corruption and Organized Crime).

Other activities
 European  Transport Safety Council, Observer
 Globe EU, Member
 Rail Forum Europe, Member
 Smart Move High Level Group (HLG), Member

References

1957 births
Living people
Spanish Socialist Workers' Party MEPs
MEPs for Spain 2004–2009
MEPs for Spain 2009–2014
MEPs for Spain 2014–2019
21st-century women MEPs for Spain
People from Zaragoza
Spanish people of Basque descent